Bronchocela rubrigularis is a species of lizard. It is endemic to the Nicobar Islands

References

Bronchocela
Reptiles described in 2009
Taxa named by Jakob Hallermann
Reptiles of India